Khor Khor may refer to:
 Khor Khor, East Azerbaijan
 Khor Khor, Kermanshah